Cargills Square is a shopping mall in the city of Jaffna in northern Sri Lanka. The mall is located in the heart of the city at the junction of Hospital Street and Mahathma Gandhi Road, opposite Jaffna Hospital. Work on the Rs.500 million shopping and entertainment complex started in September 2011. The mall opened in the last quarter of 2013. The mall was designed by the Colombo based MMGS Architects.

As well as a Cargills Food City supermarket, the  mall contains a KFC restaurant, a three screen cineplex, food court, bank, a range of shops and a basement car park. The cineplex has seating for 1,200 people and is managed by C T Holdings (formerly known as the Ceylon Theatres Group), Cargills' parent company.

References

2013 establishments in Sri Lanka
Buildings and structures in Jaffna
Shopping malls in Sri Lanka
Tourist attractions in Northern Province, Sri Lanka